Frederick Donald MacKenzie, (December 18, 1882 – October 13, 1970) was a soldier, teacher and Member of Parliament in Canada.

Mackenzie was born in Presqu'île, Ontario and was educated at Owen Sound Collegiate and Vocational Institute and Queen's University where he earned a Bachelor of Arts.

He served during the First World War with the Queen's University Hospital Unit from 1915 to 1916 in Egypt and the Dardanelles. He was subsequently a lieutenant with the Canadian Field Artillery from 1916 to 1919.

Following the war, he returned to Canada and settled in Neepawa, Manitoba, where he worked as a teacher and became a school principal.

In the 1935 federal election he ran as a Liberal candidate in Neepawa and was returned to the House of Commons of Canada. He was re-elected in the 1940 federal election but defeated in the 1945 election by the Progressive Conservative leader and former Manitoba Premier John Bracken.

He died in 1970 in Ottawa.

References

External links

 Frederick Donald MacKenzie fonds - Library and Archives Canada

1882 births
Members of the House of Commons of Canada from Manitoba
Liberal Party of Canada MPs
Canadian military personnel of World War I
1970 deaths
People from Neepawa, Manitoba